SF8 is a South Korean science fiction anthology television series. It is a movie-drama crossover project between MBC, the Directors Guild of Korea, the OTT platform  and the production company Soo Film. The director's cuts of all episodes were released on Wavve on July 10, 2020 while MBC TV aired one episode a week from August 14 to October 9, 2020.

The series has been regarded as a Korean equivalent of the British series Black Mirror as they have the same format and similar themes, though Min Kyu-dong believes that SF8 is more diversified since eight different filmmakers were involved in the project. SF8 was screened at the 24th Bucheon International Fantastic Film Festival.

Synopsis
SF8 revolves around people who dream of a perfect society. It tackles the themes of artificial intelligence, augmented reality, virtual reality, robots, games, fantasy, horror, superpowers and disasters.

Episodes
Short summaries adapted from BiFan.

Production

Development
Min Kyu-dong, creator of the series, said that "sci-fi movies were the driving force behind many movie directors' dreams. Unfortunately, due to the relatively high budget and narrow market limitations, various works were not able to be produced." He also took charge of casting the actors, which lasted for a year.

During a press conference held at CGV Yongsan I'Park Mall in Seoul on July 8, 2020, Min Kyu-dong said that all the episodes were produced with an equal amount of budget and that the overall budget was lower than one of a small commercial film. Roh Deok, who co-wrote and directed the "Manxin" episode, mentioned that "while commercial film productions [...] inevitably limit the directors' freedom as a creator, [they] had more independence in production" and "although there were physical limits, [he] thinks [they] went through the process of discovering what [they] can do inside those boundaries."

Filming
Eight directors from the Directors Guild of Korea (DGK) each directed an episode from the series. Filming began on February 21, 2020 with Jang Cheol-soo's "White Crow" and ended on May 7 with Kim Ui-seok's "Empty Body". Filming was completed within 10 filming sessions for each episode.

Credits
Credits adapted from BiFan.

Release
The director's cut was released on the OTT platform  on July 10, 2020 and the original episodes were aired on MBC TV from August 14 to October 9.

Notes

References

External links
  
 
 
 SF8 at BiFan

Korean-language television shows
MBC TV television dramas
2020 South Korean television series debuts
2020 South Korean television series endings
South Korean science fiction television series
South Korean anthology television series
Science fiction anthology television series
South Korean pre-produced television series
Wavve original programming